Piergiuseppe Maritato (born 19 March 1989) is an Italian footballer.

He represented Italy at the 2009 FIFA U-20 World Cup.

Biography
Born in Cetraro, Calabria, Maritato was a player of Juventus F.C. Youth Sector, in Turin, Piedmont.

Fiorentina
In 2008, he was signed by fellow Serie A club ACF Fiorentina on a free transfer in a 5-year contract. However, it also cost La Viola €300,000 as other fee. In 2009 Maritato was farmed to Gallipoli (along with Massimiliano Tagliani), which the club was unable to pay for the agent fee of just €12,000, for Maritato's transfer. In January 2010 Maritato was signed by Giulianova in a temporary deal.

In summer 2010 Maritato was farmed to Reggiana in a co-ownership deal for a peppercorn fee of €500.

Vicenza
In June 2011 Fiorentina bought back Maritato for €100,000, Niccolò Manfredini for €215,000, Ramzi Aya for €215,000 and Samuele Bettoni for €500; Matteo Arati to Reggiana for €180,500. The deals made Fiorentina paid Reggiana €350,000 in net in that month. In the same transfer window Maritato joined Serie B club Vicenza in another co-ownership deal for €500 in a 4-year contract. Maritato was farmed to Sorrento on 31 January 2012, and then South Tyrol on 31 August 2012. Vicenza also signed the remain 50% registration rights of Maritato from Fiorentina for free in June 2012. His contract with Vicenza was also extended.

Maritato became a member of the first team of Vicenza in 2013–14 season, after the relegation Lega Pro Prima Divisione. Maritato remained with Vicenza for the first half of 2014–15 Serie B, which the club was accidentally selected to replace A.C. Siena. Maritato picked no.9 shirt. On 2 February 2015 Maritato was signed by Calcio Como. Maritato played 4 times in Serie B and 2 times in Lega Pro respectively in 2014–15 season.

On 14 July 2015 he was re-signed by South Tyrol in a temporary deal.

On 11 August 2016 Maritato was released by Vicenza.

Reggina
In 2018, he was signed by another Serie C club Reggina after spending six months with Pontedera.

Renate
On 8 July 2019, he joined Renate on a 2-year contract.

AlbinoLeffe
On 1 February 2021, he joined AlbinoLeffe.

International career
Maritato was a player for Italy in 2005 UEFA European Under-17 Championship, which he played twice. He also participated in 2006 UEFA European Under-17 Championship elite round.

References

External links
 FIGC 
 
 Lega Serie B profile 
 

1989 births
Living people
Italian footballers
Italy youth international footballers
Juventus F.C. players
ACF Fiorentina players
A.S.D. Gallipoli Football 1909 players
Giulianova Calcio players
L.R. Vicenza players
A.S.D. Sorrento players
F.C. Südtirol players
Como 1907 players
U.S. Città di Pontedera players
Reggina 1914 players
A.C. Renate players
Piacenza Calcio 1919 players
U.C. AlbinoLeffe players
Serie B players
Serie C players
Association football forwards
F.C. Lamezia Terme players